The House of the Soviets is the headquarters of the government of Orenburg Oblast and the governor of the oblast. It is in Orenburg, the oblast's capital. It is a historic and cultural monument of the peoples of the Russian Federation under the number 5600042000.

House is located in Lenin Square. In the front is park with a fountain and a statue of Lenin.

House was built in the 1930s for the soviets (governmental councils). The house has 5 floors and a cour d'honneur. The walls were built from bricks.

The building is also home to the oblast's:
 Ministry of Finance
 Ministry of Economic Development

See also
Court Building in Orenburg

References

Buildings and structures in Orenburg
Cultural heritage monuments in Orenburg